Pseudopterogramma is a genus of flies belonging to the family Lesser Dung flies.

Species
P. annectens (Richards, 1964)
P. brevivenosum (Tenorio, 1967)
P. conicum (Richards, 1946)
P. siamensis Papp, 2008
P. insulare (Papp, 1972)

References

Sphaeroceridae
Diptera of Asia
Diptera of Australasia
Brachycera genera